Apizaco is a city in Apizaco Municipality located near the geographic center of the Mexican state of Tlaxcala, approximately 25 minutes by car from the state's capital city of Tlaxcala. The city gets its name from the Nahuatl language words "ātl" (water), "pitzāhuac" (thin), and the suffix "co" (place), forming "Āpitzāco", or roughly "thin water place".  Those seeking to reach the port of Veracruz by railroad from Mexico City must travel through Apizaco.  The city began because of its location on this railroad. 

Universities in Apizaco include the Technological Institute of Apizaco (Instituto Tecnológico de Apizaco), and most recently, the University of the Valley of Tlaxcala (Universidad del Valle de Tlaxcala)

The city's climate is temperate and arid.  Temperature in the winter can fall below 0°C, and in the summer, it can reach in excess of 30°C.

The city is the second in importance after the capital city, Tlaxcala. It is of major commercial and trade value to the state because it is halfway on the road between Mexico City and the port of Veracruz.

The census of 2005 reported a population of 49,459 in the city of Apizaco, while the municipality had 73,097 inhabitants. The city is the second largest in the state in population, behind only Villa Vicente Guerrero. The municipality has an area of 56.83 km² (21.94 sq mi) and includes a small number of other communities, the largest of which are Santa Anita Huiloac, Santa María Texcalac, and San Luis Apizaquito.

Climate

Transportation
Apizaco is close to Mexico City's proposed plan to make a new larger international airport near Apizaco to lessen the congested airspace.
Ferrosur passes through Apizaco.

References

External links

Comité de Transparencia Apizaco Official website
Link to tables of population data from Census of 2005 INEGI: Instituto Nacional de Estadística, Geografía e Informática
Tlaxcala Enciclopedia de los Municipios de México

Populated places in Tlaxcala